Tika or TIKA may refer to:

 Tika (crater), a crater on Saturn's satellite Rhea
 Tika, Estonia, village in Võru County
 Apache Tika, content analysis software
 Tika Waylan, a character in the DragonLance series of fantasy novels
 Tika and The Dissidents, an Indonesian band
 Bhai Tika, a Hindu festival
 "Tika Tika Tok", a 1955 song by Alma Cogan
 Tika Zone, part of the Rhino Camp Refugee Settlement, Uganda
 Tilaka, a mark worn usually on the forehead in Hinduism
 Turkish Cooperation and Coordination Agency, an international development government agency
 Sub-commentaries (Theravāda), in Theravada Buddhism
 Crown Prince, a title in certain Indian monarchies 
 Peter (name), where "Tika" is an Albanian variation of a nickname for Petrika
Tika giacchinoi an extinct genus of rhynchocephalian reptile from the Late Cretaceous of South America.

People with the name Tika
 Tika (singer) (born 1980), Indonesian singer
 Tika Bhandari (born 1964), Nepalese musician
 Tika Bogati (born 1962), Nepalese long-distance runner
 Tika Bravani (born 1990), Indonesian actress
 Tika Patsatsia (born 1981), Georgian entertainer
 Tika Ram Paliwal (1909–1995), Indian politician
 Tika Shrestha (born 1964), Nepalese sport shooter
 Tika Simone (a/k/a TiKA), Canadian rhythm and blues singer
 Tika Sumpter (born 1980), American entertainer
 Tika, character from The Wacky Adventures of Ronald McDonald

See also
 Tikka (disambiguation)